Alfrēds Čepānis (born 3 August 1943, in Kalsnava Parish) is a Latvian politician and the former Speaker of the Saeima from 1996 to 1998.

Biography 
Čepānis was born in a Lithuanian and Belarusian family, where they spoke only Latvian in their household. In 1957, he graduated from Kalsnava Primary School and continued his studies at Jaungulbene Vocational School and Riga.  After graduating from primary school, Čepānis worked in agriculture where was an assistant tractor driver, tractor driver and combine harvester. From 1968 to 1974, he worked for the Komsomol and in 1973 graduated in part from the Higher Party School in Moscow.

In 1990, Čepānis was elected as the deputy of the Supreme Council in. In 1993 he was elected to the 5th Saeima as a part of the Democratic Center Party of Latvia, and two years later was elected to the 6th Saeima as a part of the Democratic Party "Saimnieks", becoming a member of the Speaker of the Saeima. On September 26, 1996, after Ilga Kreituse resigned from the faction, Čepānis became the 7th Speaker of the Saeima.

In 1999, he was elected to the Council of Trasta Komercbanka and later became its Deputy Chairman in 2006. He was elected to the Riga City Council in 2006 for the Latvian Democratic Party, the successor of "Saimnieka." Following the liquidation of Latvian Democratic Party in 2004, he became a founder of the party New Centre.

Honors 
 :
 Commander with Chain of the Order of the Three Stars

References 

1943 births
Living people
People from Madona Municipality
Communist Party of Latvia politicians
Democratic Center Party of Latvia politicians
Democratic Party "Saimnieks" politicians
New Centre (Latvia) politicians
Members of the Supreme Soviet of the Latvian Soviet Socialist Republic, 1980–1985
Members of the Supreme Soviet of the Latvian Soviet Socialist Republic, 1985–1990
Deputies of the Supreme Council of the Republic of Latvia
Deputies of the 5th Saeima
Deputies of the 6th Saeima
Speakers of the Saeima
Recipients of the Order of the Three Stars